Aaron Kaufman (born January 26, 1982) is an American television personality, racing driver, and owner of Arclight Fabrication, a Dallas enterprise that supplies aftermarket components for the Ford F-100 pickup.

He is the former lead mechanic for Gas Monkey Garage. He formerly starred in a one-season television show entitled Shifting Gears with Aaron Kaufman which premiered on March 5, 2018, featuring his new business with Arclight.

In September 2015, Kaufman competed in the Speed Energy Formula Off-Road (Stadium Super Trucks) series, driving a Toyo Tires-sponsored truck at the Sand Sports Super Show in Costa Mesa, California. He ran two rounds during the weekend, finishing fifth in both his heat races, followed by tenth- and eighth-place runs in the features. Kaufman struggled during the races, including one incident in which his truck partially rode on a K-rail; after the race, fellow driver Robby Gordon joked it was "some of the best, worst driving I have ever seen from the Toyo Tires driver."

Motorsports career results

Stadium Super Trucks
(key) (Bold – Pole position. Italics – Fastest qualifier. * – Most laps led.)

References

American company founders
Participants in American reality television series
Living people
1982 births
Stadium Super Trucks drivers
People from Crowley, Texas
21st-century American businesspeople